Rob Pardo (born June 9, 1970) is an American video game designer. He is the former Chief Creative Officer at Blizzard Entertainment, resigning on July 3, 2014. Previously he was the Executive Vice President of game design at Blizzard Entertainment, and prior to that the lead designer of World of Warcraft. In 2006, he was named by Time Magazine as one of the 100 most influential people in the world.

Pardo founded Bonfire Studios in 2016. He raised $25 million from Andreessen Horowitz and Riot Games.

Games
Rob Pardo has been credited on the following games:

Lead Designer
World of Warcraft: The Burning Crusade
World of Warcraft
Warcraft III: The Frozen Throne
Warcraft III: Reign of Chaos
StarCraft: Brood War

Designer
World of Warcraft: Warlords of Draenor
Diablo II
Warcraft II: Battle.net Edition
StarCraft
Diablo III
Producer
Mortal Kombat Trilogy
Tempest X3
Whiplash

Executive producer
Diablo III

EverQuest
Pardo played a Wood Elf Warrior named Ariel. He was Guild master of the EverQuest guild Legacy of Steel, which accomplished many world-firsts. He met friend and former coworker Tigole (Jeffrey Kaplan) during his time in Legacy of Steel. Tigole would go on to replace him as guild leader and was eventually offered a position as designer alongside Pardo.

References

External links

 GameSpy interview

1970 births
Living people
American video game designers
Blizzard Entertainment people
Place of birth missing (living people)